Cave Springs is a ghost town in Elk County, Kansas, United States.

History
Cave Springs was founded in 1873.

The post office in Cave Springs closed in 1903.

References

Further reading

External links
 Elk County maps: Current, Historic, KDOT

Unincorporated communities in Elk County, Kansas
Unincorporated communities in Kansas